Allen Gordon Richter (February 7, 1927 – October 29, 2017) was an American professional baseball player.

Biography
He batted and threw right-handed. Richter was Jewish; he attended Matthew Fontaine Maury High School in  Norfolk, the University of Miami in Coral Gables, Florida, and  Virginia Polytechnic Institute and State University in Blacksburg, Virginia.

Richter played ten seasons (1945; 1947–55) in minor league baseball and appeared in six Major League games for the Boston Red Sox in the 1951 and 1953 seasons, hitting a single in 11 at bats for a .091 batting average while scoring one run. In four fielding appearances, he made clean plays on his 20 chances and posted a 1.000 fielding percentage. His lone hit came off Spec Shea at Yankee Stadium on September 30, 1951. Richter's best minor league season came in 1951, when he batted .321 with 164 hits in 129 games played at the Triple-A level. Richter died in October 2017, aged 90.

See also
Boston Red Sox all-time roster

References

External links
 and Retrosheet

1927 births
2017 deaths
Baseball players from Norfolk, Virginia
Boston Red Sox players
Jewish American baseball players
Jewish Major League Baseball players
Louisville Colonels (minor league) players
Lynn Red Sox players
Major League Baseball shortstops
Oneonta Red Sox players
Rochester Red Wings players
San Diego Padres (minor league) players
Scranton Red Sox players
University of Miami alumni
Virginia Tech alumni
21st-century American Jews